Langon is a railway station in Langon, Nouvelle-Aquitaine, France. The station opened on 31 May 1854 and is located on the Bordeaux–Sète railway line. The station is served by TER (local) services operated by SNCF. The station was also located on the line from Gabarret, which closed in 1923.

Train services
The following services currently call at Langon:
local service (TER Nouvelle-Aquitaine) Bordeaux - Langon - Marmande - Agen

References

Railway stations in France opened in 1854
Railway stations in Gironde